Muntzenheim is a commune in the Haut-Rhin department, Alsace, administrative region of Grand Est, France.

See also
 Communes of the Haut-Rhin département

References

Communes of Haut-Rhin